Palya Lankesh (8 March 1935 – 25 January 2000) was an Indian poet, fiction writer, playwright, translator, screenplay writer and journalist who wrote in the Kannada language. He was also an award-winning film director.

Early life and career 

Lankesh was born in the small village of Konagavalli in Shimoga, Karnataka. After graduating with an honours degree in English from Central College at Bengaluru, Lankesh completed his Master of Arts degree in English from Maharaja's College, Mysore.

His 1976 film Pallavi—a cinematic narration, told from the female protagonist's point of view and based on his novel Biruku—won the National Award for Best Direction (Swarna Kamal). Lankesh quit his job as an assistant professor in English at Bangalore University in 1980 and started Lankesh Patrike, the first Kannada tabloid, which influenced Kannada culture and politics.

Lankesh's first work was the collection of short stories Kereya Neeranu Kerege Chelli (1963). His other works include the novels Biruku ("The Fissure"), Mussanjeya Kathaprasanga (A Story at Dusk), Akka (Sister); the plays T. Prasannana Grihastashrama ("The Householder-hood of T.Prasanna"), Sankranti ("Revolution"), Nanna Tangigondu Gandu Kodi ("A Groom for my Sister") and Gunamukha ("Convalescence"); the short story collections, Umapatiya Scholarship Yatre ("Umapati's Scholarship Trip"), Kallu Karaguva Samaya (When the Stone Melts; winner of the 1993 Sahitya Akademi Award), Paapada Hoogalu, the translation of Charles Baudelaire's Les Fleurs du Mal and Dore Oedipus mattu Antigone, translation of Sophocles' Antigone and Oedipus Rex.

Lankesh Patrike 
Lankesh was the Editor of Lankesh Patrike from 1980 until his death in 2000. A socialist and Lohiaite, he was known for his secular, anti-caste and anti-Hindutva views. Before starting Lankesh Patrike, he and friends Tejaswi and K.Ramadas had toured the length and breadth of Karnataka, mobilising people to vote for their new socialist party Karnataka Pragatiranga Vedike This trip, he recounted in one of his editorials, which took him to the remotest parts of Karnataka opened his eyes to the plight of the poor, the Dalits and the Muslims and made him realise his responsibility as a writer and an intellectual towards the society. 
After his death Lankesh Patrike was split into two, one edited by his daughter Gauri Lankesh and the other managed by his son Indrajit Lankesh. Lankesh's other daughter is the film director Kavita Lankesh.
Lankesh Patrike, as the first Kannada tabloid, had a huge impact on Karnataka politics and culture. It led to the setting up of other tabloids like Hai Bangalore and Agni which concentrated more on crime and political scandals.

Death 
Lankesh died of a heart attack on 25 January 2000, aged 64.

Awards

 National Award for Best Direction for Pallavi. (1976)

 Sahitya Akademi Award for Kallu Karaguva Samaya Mattu Ithara Kathegalu (1993).

 Karnataka Sahitya Akademi Honorary Award (1986).

 B.H. Shridhara Prashasti.

 Karnataka Rajya Nataka Akademi Prashasti.

 Aryabhata Sahitya Prashasti.

Filmfare Award for Best Film – Kannada for Ellindalo Bandavaru - 1980

Bibliography 

Only two of his books are available in English translation, When Stone Melts and Other Stories (translation of Kallu Karaguva Samaya)  and Sankranti. His works have also been translated into Tamil and Hindi.

Collection of short stories

 Kereya Nirannu Kerege Chelli Mattu Ithara Kathegalu (1963).

 Nanalla Mattu Ithara Kathegalu (1970).

 Umapathiya Scholarship Yatre Mattu Ithara Kathegalu (1973).

 Kallu Karaguva Samaya Mattu Ithara Kathegalu (1990) (Sahitya Akademi Award for 1993).

 Ullanghane Mattu Ithara Kathegalu" (1996).

 Manju Kavida Sanje Mattu Ithara Kathegalu (2001).

Novels
 Biruku (1967).
 Mussanjeya Katha Prasanga (1978).
 Akka (1991).

Plays
 T. Prasannana Gruhasthashrama (1962).
 Nanna Thangigondu Gandu Kodi (1963).
 Polisariddare, Eccharike! (1964).
 Teregalu (1964).
 Kranti Bantu, Karanti (1965).
 Giliyu Panjaradolilla (1966).
 Siddhate (1970).
 Biruku (1973).
 Sankranti (1971).
 Gunamukha (1993).

Translated plays
 Dore Oedipus (Oedipus Rex) (1971).
 Antigone (1971).

Collection of poems

 Bichchu (1965).

 Talemaaru (1973).

 Akshara Hosa Kavya (Collected and Edited) (1970).

 Paapada Hoogalu (1974) (a translation of Charles Baudelaire's Les Fleurs du Mal).

 Chitra Samooha (1999) [Collection of Complete Poems].

Autobiography
 Hulimavina Mara (1997).

Critical and other essay collections
 Prasthutha (1970).
 Kandaddu Kanda Haage (1975).
 Teeke-Tippani, volumes 1 and 2 (1997).
 Teeke-Tippani, volume 3 (1998).

Posthumous publications
 Neelu Kavya (vols 1, 2, and 3) (2007, 2009, 2010).
 Sahiti Sahitya Vimarshe (2008).
 Mareyuva munna collected vol 1 (2009).
 Mareyuva munna collected vol 2 (2010).
 "Bittu Hoda Putagalu - 1".
 "Bittu Hoda Putagalu - 2".
 "Bittu Hoda Putagalu - 3".

Filmography 
 Pallavi (National Film Award for Best Direction, 1976).
 Anuroopa (1978).
 Khandavide Ko Maamsavide Ko (1979).
 Ellindalo Bandavaru (1980).

References

External links 
 A Girl Called Stella, short story translated by B.C. Ramchandra Sharma. 
 A Door – a short story by Lankesh
 P. Lankesh Bio in Kannada. Kanaja.in
 Neelu Kavya (in Kannada)

1935 births
2000 deaths
Best Director National Film Award winners
Film directors from Karnataka
Indian socialists
Kannada people
Kannada-language writers
People from Shimoga district
Recipients of the Sahitya Akademi Award in Kannada
20th-century Indian film directors
20th-century Indian short story writers
20th-century Indian novelists
20th-century Indian dramatists and playwrights
20th-century Indian translators
20th-century Indian essayists
Writers from Bangalore
Dramatists and playwrights from Karnataka
Novelists from Karnataka
Poets from Karnataka